Imre Kinszki (1901–1945) was a Jewish-Hungarian photographer.

Biography
Imre Kinszki was born in Budapest, Hungary in 1901. He captured motion and speed, architecture, and city life. In 1937, together with Erno Vadas and Gusztáv Seiden, he co-founded the Modern Hungarian Photographers Group. His photographs and articles appeared in American Photography and National Geographic. The KINSECTA camera was invented by Kinszki to improve on the technique of close-up photography.

In 1943, during the Second World War, he was sent to forced labor camps in Romania and Hungary. He died on the way to Sachsenhausen concentration camp in 1945.

References

1901 births
Hungarian Jews who died in the Holocaust
Photographers from Budapest
Jewish artists
1945 deaths
Hungarian civilians killed in World War II
Hungarian World War II forced labourers